HD 143787 is a single star in the southern constellation of Scorpius. It is a fifth magnitude star – apparent visual magnitude of 4.973, and hence is visible to the unaided eye. It is moving closer to Earth with a heliocentric radial velocity of −37.9 km/s, and should come within  in 1.2 million years.

This is an evolved giant star with a stellar classification of K3 III. It is a red clump giant, which means it is on the horizontal branch and is generating energy through helium fusion at its core. At the age of 4.46 billion years, it has 1.25 times the mass of the Sun and is radiating 61.7 times the Sun's luminosity from its enlarged photosphere at an effective temperature of 4,370 K.

References

K-type giants
Horizontal-branch stars
Scorpius (constellation)
Durchmusterung objects
143787
078650
5969